Loomis is an English language surname.

People surnamed Loomis
 Alfred Loomis (disambiguation), several people
 Andrew Loomis (1892–1959), illustrator
 Arphaxed Loomis (1798–1885), American politician
 Bernard Loomis (1923–2006), American toy inventor/marketer
 Charles Battell Loomis (1861–1911), American author
 Chauncey Loomis (ca. 1783–1817), New York politician
 Chester Loomis (1789–1873), New York politician
 Clinton "Fear" Loomis (born 1988), Professional Dota Gamer
 David B. Loomis (1817–1897), American politician
 Dwight Loomis (1821–1903), American politician
 Eben Jenks Loomis (1828–1912), American astronomer
 Edward Eugene Loomis (1864–1937), president of the Lehigh Valley Railroad 
 Elias Loomis (1811–1889), American mathematician
 Elisha Scott Loomis (1852–1940), American teacher, mathematician, genealogist, writer and engineer
 Evarts G. Loomis (1910–2003), American physician
 Francis Loomis (disambiguation), several people
 Frank Loomis (1896–1971), American athlete
 Frank Fowler Loomis (1854-1936), American inventor and firefighter
 Frederic Brewster Loomis, American paleontologist.
 Frederick Oscar Warren Loomis (1870 –1937), Canadian major-general
 Gustavus Loomis (1789–1872), American soldier
 Hamilton Loomis (born 1975), American blues guitarist, singer, songwriter, and record producer
 Harold F. Loomis (1896–1972), American botanist and millipede taxonomist
 Harvey Worthington Loomis (1865-1930), American composer 
 Henry Loomis (1919-2008), American businessman 
 James H. Loomis (1823–1914), New York politician
 Jeff Loomis (born 1971), guitarist
 John Mason Loomis (1825-1900), American businessman
 John Q. Loomis (c. 1824–1869), Confederate Army officer
 Jon Loomis (born 1959), American writer
 Laura Hibbard Loomis (1883–1960), American literary scholar
 Louise Ropes Loomis (1874–1958), American historian
 Lynn Harold Loomis (1915–1994) American mathematician
 Mabel Loomis Todd (1856–1932), born Mabel Loomis, American writer
 Mahlon Loomis (1826–1886), an early pioneer of radio telegraphy, said to have invented the wireless radio
 Mickey Loomis, General Manager of the New Orleans Saints football franchise
 Nancy Loomis, stage name of American actress Nancy Kyes (born 1949)
 Noel Loomis, (1905–1969), American writer of fiction and history 
 Orland Steen Loomis (1893–1942), Governor-elect of Wisconsin
 Rick Loomis, American game designer
 Rick Loomis (photojournalist), (born 1969), American photojournalist
 Robbie Loomis (born 1964), American former NASCAR crew chief
 Robert Loomis (born 1926), American editor
 Roger Sherman Loomis (1887–1966), American academic
 Roland Loomis (born 1930), father of the modern primitive movement
 Samuel Loomis (disambiguation), several people 
 Silas Laurence Loomis (1822–1896), American scientist and educator
 Stanley Loomis, American writer of French history

Fictional characters
 Sam Loomis, a character in the Psycho franchise
 Peggy Loomis, a character in the film The Town That Dreaded Sundown
 Dr. Samuel Loomis, a character in the Halloween film series
 Willie Loomis, a character in the Dark Shadows television series
 Billy Loomis, a character in the first Scream movie
 Oswald Loomis, Superman villain the Prankster

See also 
 Loomis (disambiguation) for other meanings

References

English-language surnames